

Schedule
The schedule for the 2010 First Citizens Cup, as announced by the TT Pro League:

Bracket

Results
All matches were played for 90 minutes duration, at the end of which if the match was still tied, penalty-kicks were used to determine the match winner.

9th place playoff

Qualifying round

Quarterfinals

Semifinals

Final

References

External links
Official Website

2010 First Citizens Cup
Trinidad and Tobago FCB Cup
lea